The title duke of Terceira, de juro e herdade (meaning "forever granted") was created by decree of King Pedro IV of Portugal, on 8 November 1832. António José de Souza Manoel de Menezes Severim de Noronha, 7th Count of Vila Flor, de juro e herdade, and 1st Marquis of Vila Flor, was the first holder of the title.

Family name and origins
The Duke of Terceira was the head of the Manoel de Vilhena family. Heads of the Portuguese branch of that family have been ennobled since the marriage of Constance Manoel with King Pedro I of Portugal. Her brother, Henrique Manoel, was brought into her entourage, and he was made Count of Seia, in Portugal, by his brother-in-law, the king.

This family is also represented in Spain, where the family head is the Duke of Arévalo d'El Rey, Count of Via Manoel, Marquis of Puebla de la Rocamora, etc.

The family dates back to the first count of Vila Flor D. Sancho Manoel de Vilhena, descent in male line from Juan Manuel de Villena, the second son of the 3rd Lord of Cheles, knight of the Order of the Golden Fleece and Mayordomo-Mor of the Emperor Charles V, who descended from the Infante Juan Manuel, Prince of Villena, the grandson of King Fernando III of Castile.

The first duke

The 1st Duke of Terceira (1792–1860) descended from Sancho Manoel de Vilhena, the 1st Count of Vila-Flor and Marshal of the Portuguese Army during the Portuguese Restoration War against Spain, winner (together with António Luís de Meneses, 1st Marquis of Marialva) of the battles of Linhas de Elvas, Montes Claros and the Ameixial. He was also appointed Viceroy of Brazil.

Hero of the Liberal Wars, the 7th Count of Vila-Flor received the highest aristocratic title, duke, as well as the profound honor of being named Marshal of the army, honors he received because of the resistance he led on Terceira against the Miguelist forces. After conquering Porto, he led the liberal forces into Lisbon, on 24 July 1833. He won the Battle of Asseiceira, which put an end to the civil war, and he signed the peace treaty (Concession of Evoramonte) on behalf of King Pedro IV of Portugal.

After the war he was four times, briefly, Prime Minister of Portugal, namely:
from April to September, 1836;
In April and May, 1851; and
from March 1859 until his death, on 26 April 1860.

The succession
The title of Duke of Terceira was inherited, de juro e herdade, by the 10th Countess of Vila Flor, Maria Luísa de Almeida Manoel de Vilhena, Countess of Alpedrinha, Head of the Portuguese branch of the Manoel de Vilhena family, since the title of Duke of Terceira was given to the Count of Vila Flor, in memory of the many services paid to the Crown and the Portuguese Kingdom.  She was the daughter of Francisco Maria Martinho de Almeida Manoel de Vilhena, the 9th Count of Vila-Flor, and granddaughter of Tomás Maria Martinho de Almeida Manoel de Vilhena, the 8th Count of Vila Flor, head of King Manuel II's government in exile, Senator, and Governor of Braga and Madeira Island.

List of the dukes of Terceira
D. António de Noronha (1792–1860)
D. Maria Luísa da Conceição de Almeida Manuel de Vilhena (1926–1998)
D. Lourenço da Bandeira Manuel de Vilhena de Freitas (1973– ), Professor, D. iuris of Law, KHS, KGCSt.MW, former Vice Delegate and KGOOSML.

Present day
The family lives at Palace Vila-Flor in Lisbon, next to the Castle of São Jorge.

The Duke of Terceira, XII Count of Vila Flor, IV Count of Alpedrinha, VI Count and Viscount of Azarujinha, etc., D. Lourenço Manoel de Vilhena, D. Iuris in Law, is a professor at the Faculty of Law, University of Lisbon, lawyer (partner of Cuatrecasas), formerly advisor and acting chef de cabinet to several governmental members.

Former member of the Council of Nobility and founding member of the Instituto da Nobreza de Portugal, the regulatory body of nobiliarchic matters, authorized by the Duke of Braganza and recognized by the Republic, he was also the representative of the Brazilian Nobility Association to European countries.

Married in 2006, the heir to the earldoms and to the dukedom was D. Cristóvão António José do Pópulo Manoel de Vilhena, according to tradition Master of Pancas, godson of the Duchess of Braganza and D. Luís de Almeida Portugal (Lavradio), XIII Count of Avintes.

See also
List of Portuguese Prime Ministers
List of Portuguese Dukedoms

External links
 Genealogy of the Dukes of Terceira, in Portuguese

Bibliography
"Nobreza de Portugal e do Brasil" – Vol. III, pages 429/432. Published by Zairol Lda., Lisbon 1989.

 
Dukedoms of Portugal
Portuguese noble families
Portuguese nobility
1832 establishments in Portugal